The 2019 24 Hours of Daytona (formally the 2019 Rolex 24 at Daytona) was an International Motor Sports Association (IMSA)-sanctioned endurance sports car race held at the Daytona International Speedway combined road course in Daytona Beach, Florida, on January 26–27, 2019. It was the 57th running of the race, and the first of 12 races in the 2019 IMSA WeatherTech Sportscar Championship, and the first of four rounds of the 2019 Michelin Endurance Cup. The race was ended ahead of the 22nd Hour, due to heavy rainfall. The race was won overall by Renger van der Zande, Jordan Taylor, Fernando Alonso, and Kamui Kobayashi in the #10 Wayne Taylor Racing Cadillac DPi-V.R. The LMP2 class was won by the #18 DragonSpeed Oreca 07, piloted by Pastor Maldonado, Roberto Gonzalez, Sebastián Saavedra and Ryan Cullen. The GTLM class was won by the #25 BMW Team RLL BMW M8 GTE of Connor de Phillippi, Augusto Farfus, Philipp Eng, and Colton Herta. The GTD class was won for a second consecutive year by the #11 GRT Grasser Racing Team Lamborghini Huracan GT3 Evo of Rolf Ineichen, Mirko Bortolotti, Rik Breukers, and Christian Engelhart.

Background

Regulation changes 
Prior to the 2019 WeatherTech SportsCar Championship, a raft of regulation changes were made, which saw significant changes to both Prototypes and GT3 cars entered in the 2019 event. The Prototype class, which previously combined Daytona Prototype International cars, alongside Le Mans Prototype LMP2 cars was now split into 2 separate classes,  the Daytona Prototype International (DPi) class, and the Le Mans Prototype 2 (LMP2) class. The DPi class would be the top class of the Championship, and will feature teams with full Professional Lineups running Daytona Prototype International cars, with its own class-based Balance of Performance (BoP). The LMP2 class would be the lower prototype class of the 2, featuring Global Specification LMP2 cars, and Pro-Am lineups, with no BoP being applied to the class. The Pro-Am classes in the Championship (LMP2 and GTD) were also now required to adhere to driver rating requirements, with each car being allowed only 2 Platinum/Gold rated drivers for the Rolex 24, and one Platinum/Gold rated driver for the other Endurance Races, alongside the requirement of 1 Bronze/Silver rated driver for every Sprint race. Bronze or Silver rated drivers would also be required to start the race in these categories. Cars in the DPi, LMP2, as well as the GTD classes will also run on Michelin tyres, instead of Continentals while the GT Le Mans (GTLM) class would continue to be an open-tyre class.

Entry list 
Ahead of the Roar Before the 24 tests at the track, IMSA released an entry list of the teams due to participate in the compulsory 3 day tests. The entry list listed 47 teams across the four classes: 11 entries in the DPi class, 4 in the LMP2 class, as well as 9 in the GTLM class, featuring Group GTE Cars, as well as 23 in the GT Daytona (GTD) class. Each car was driven by two drivers who were to complete in the whole WeatherTech Sportscar Championship season, alongside 1–2 additional drivers, with one of the two additional drivers participating in the whole Michelin Endurance Cup season. These drivers came from a variety of categories, such as the FIA World Endurance Championship (Fernando Alonso, Kamui Kobayashi, Harry Tincknell), the IndyCar Series (Simon Pagenaud, Alexander Rossi), the Deutsche Tourenwagen Masters (René Rast, Loïc Duval).

Testing

Pre-testing Balance of Performance (BoP) 
Ahead of the Roar Before the 24 Tests, IMSA issued a pre-test BoP, on December 21, 2018, aiming to create parity in each class among the cars, as well as to separate the performances of cars in each class. The DPis were given a 10 kg weight reduction, as well as increased boost pressure for Turbocharged Engines, while Naturally Aspirated Engines received a larger air restrictor. The LMP2 cars were given a 10 kg weight addition, alongside a five-litre reduction in fuel capacity, and a 4 second increased refuelling time. Changes were also made to both the GTLM class, with the BMW M8 GTE, and the Porsche 911 RSR getting a weight break, with the Ferrari 488 GTE was given a 5 kg weight increase, the Ford GT a 20 kg weight increase, and the Corvette C7.R remaining unchanged. The GTD class saw several changes

Roar Before the 24 Tests 
The Roar Before the 24 tests occurred from January 4 to 6, 2019, with all cars participating in the test. The first session on Friday morning saw the #77 Mazda RT-24P entered by Mazda Team Joest top timesheets with a 1:35.989 lap, while the #52 Oreca 07 entered by PR1/Mathiasen Motorsports topped the LMP2 category with a 1:39.828 by Gabriel Aubry. GTLM was topped by #911 911 RSR, with Patrick Pilet at the wheel setting a 1:44.866, while Jeroen Bleekemolen set a 1:47.188 in the #33 AMG GT3. The second session on Friday afternoon had the #10 Cadillac DPi-V.R of Wayne Taylor Racing top the session with a 1:36.596 by Kamui Kobayashi, while Gabriel Aubrey topped the LMP2 category again with 1:39.575. Davide Rigon set a 1:44.718 in the #62 Risi Competizione Ferrari 488 GTE Evo, to top GTLM, while the #33 topped GTD once more with a 1:46.452 from Jeroen Bleekemolen.

The first session on Saturday morning saw the #55 Mazda RT-24P set the pace, with Harry Tincknell setting a 1:34.925. The #52 Oreca 07 topped the timesheet again in LMP2 with a 1:38.107 from Matt McMurry. The #912 Porsche 911 RSR topped GTLM, with a 1:43.862 from Mathieu Jaminet, while the #540 Black Swan Racing 911 GT3 R topped the GTD category with a 1:45.919 from Matteo Cairoli. The Afternoon session was led by the #10 Wayne Taylor Racing Cadillac DPi-V.R with Renger Van Der Zande setting a 1:34.534, with LMP2 being led once more by Gabriel Aubry in the #52 Oreca with a 1:37.083 lap. GTLM was led by the #67 Ford GT with Richard Westbrook setting a 1:43.148, with GTD being led by Trent Hindman in the #86 Meyer Shank Racing w/ Curb-Agajanian Acura NSX GT3, with a 1:45.533 lap. The Night session saw Jonathan Bomarito set the pace in the #55 Mazda RT-24P, with a 1:34.533, while the #52 led LMP2 once more, with a 1:36.990 from Gabriel Aubry. GTLM saw Nick Tandy set a 1:43.402 in the #911 Porsche 911 RSR, with GTD led by the #13 Via Italia Racing Ferrari 488 GT3 Evo with a 1:45.842 from Victor Franzoni. GTD had a Qualifying session on the day itself, which was meant to allocate garages for the teams, with Ana Beatriz securing the top spot with a 1:45.537 in the #57 Meyer Shank Racing Acura NSX GT3, after P1 Motorsport was disqualified from the session for using a gold driver (Dominik Baumann), in spite of it setting the fastest time.

The morning session on Sunday saw Harry Tincknell top the lap times in the #55 Mazda RT-24P, with a 1:34.224, while Ben Hanley led LMP2 with a 1:35.975 in the 81 DragonSpeed Oreca 07, and GTLM was led by Richard Westbrook in the #67 Ford GT with a 1:43.083. The Last Session on Sunday, where only 14 cars ran, saw the #54 CORE Autosport Nissan-Onroak DPi top the times with a 1:35.176 from Loic Duval, while LMP2 was led by the #81 DragonSpeed Oreca 07, with a 1:36.188 from Nicolas Lapierre, and GTLM led by the #911 Porsche 911 RSR, with a 1:43.848 from Patrick Pilet. The Qualifying for DPi, LMP2 and GTLM saw Oliver Jarvis earn the top spot for Mazda Team Joest in the #77 Mada RT-24P, with a 1:33.398 which also unofficially broke the track record, while the #52 topped the LMP2 class with a 1:35.930 from Gabriel Aubry, while GTLM was led by the #3 Corvette C7.R with a 1:42.651 from Jan Magnussen.

Post-testing Balance of Performance Adjustments 
On January 16, 2019, IMSA released a technical bulletin with regards to the Balance of Performance of the cars competing in the Rolex 24. Unlike previous years. there were only minor tweaks to selected cars, and saw no significant performance related adjustments. In the Daytona Prototype International class, 3 of the 4 cars saw changes to their fuel capacity, with the Acura ARX-05 and Mazda RT24-P each losing 2 liters and the Cadillac DPi-V.R being reduced by 1 liter. The Nissan-Onroak DPi, meanwhile, has an adjusted Lambda, while the Mazda RT-24P was mandated to run its high downforce rear wing package instead of “2019 Opt. 1” that was outlined in the initial pre-testing BoP. In GT Le Mans, the BMW M8 GTE received a 2-liter fuel capacity increase, while an adjustment was made to the Ferrari 488 GTE’s RPM redline. The GT Daytona class saw the Lamborghini Huracan GT3 Evo get a 1 mm larger air restrictor, along with a related 2-liter increase in fuel capacity, while the BMW M6 GT3 received a 15 kg weight break. Fuel capacities were also adjusted for the new-for-2019 Porsche 911 GT3 R (+3 liters) and Acura NSX GT3 Evo (−3 liters), while IMSA elected to not slow down the GTD Class.

Practice 
Four practice sessions were held before the start of the race on Saturday, three on Thursday and one on Friday. The first two sessions on Thursday morning and afternoon were 45 minutes and 75 Minutes in length, while third held later that evening ran for 90 minutes, and the fourth on Friday morning lasted an hour.

In Practice 1, which was held in damp conditions, Felipe Nasr set the fastest lap, in the #31 Whelen Engineering Cadillac DPi-V.R, with a best of 1:36.108, in a session which saw just four of the eleven DPi cars set flying laps on slick tires during the damp session. Behind Nasr was Filipe Albuquerque, who gave the Action Express Racing a 1–2, in the #5 Mustang Sampling Cadillac, with a best of 1:36.707.  Tristan Vautier’s 1:37.595 effort in the No. 85 JDC-Miller Motorsports Cadillac and Jonathan Bomarito’s 1:38.561 in the No. 55 Mazda RT-24P were the only other competitive times set on Thursday morning. The 5th best time, and the top time in the GTLM class was set by Frederic Makowiecki, in the #911 Porsche 911 RSR on slick Michelins putting a gap of eight-tenths over Mathieu Jaminet in the German manufacturer’s No. 912 car, whilst Joey Hand moved Ford Chip Ganassi Racing up to third late on, although his final effort was over a second off the Porsche pace up front. In GTD, Corey Lewis ended the morning quickest with a 1:46.577 in the #48 Paul Miller Racing Lamborghini Huracan GT3 Evo. This lap came during the 15-minute extension of the event’s first practice session dedicated to silver and bronze drivers in the secondary GT class. Henrik Hedman topped the charts in LMP2 for DragonSpeed with a 1:46.657 in the team’s FIA World Endurance Championship Oreca 07 Gibson.

In Practice 2, Jonathan Bomarito, driving the #55 Mazda RT24-P, setting a 1:34.672, was a full 0.711 seconds faster than second place Filipe Albuquerque in the No. 5 Mustang Sampling Racing Cadillac DPi-V.R. Colin Braun checked in with the third fastest time, set early in the session, in the #54 CORE Autosport Nissan Onroak DPi, while Ricky Taylor and Agustin Canapino completed the top five for Acura Team Penske and Juncos Racing, respectively. In LMP2, a late effort from James Allen put the No. 81 DragonSpeed Oreca 07 Gibson at the head of the four-car class by 0.257 seconds over Gabriel Aubry in the No. 52 from PR1/Mathiasen, with a 1:37.255. In GTLM, Nick Tandy was quickest in the GT Le Mans class in the #911 Porsche 911 RSR, with him setting a 1:43.475, followed by the #3 Corvette C7.R of Jan Magnussen with a 1:43.561, and the #67 Ford Chip Ganassi Racing Ford GT of Ryan Briscoe 1:43.755. Daniel Serra turned in the fastest lap in GTD, in the #51 Spirit of Race Ferrari 488 GT3 with a 1:45.936, while Trent Hindman and Ben Keating completed the top three in class for Meyer Shank Racing and Mercedes-AMG Team Riley Motorsports, setting a 1:46.184 and 1:46.244 respectively.

In Practice 3, which was held at night, Loic Duval put the #54 CORE Autosport Nissan DPi at the top, with a 1:34.786, while a 1:34.905 was set by Filipe Albuquerque in the #5 Action Express Racing Cadillac DPi-V.R. None of the Mazda RT24-P prototypes turned laps in Thursday evening practice after the Joest Racing team elected to carry out separate planned engine changes. In LMP2, Ben Hanley led the class, with a 1:36.521 in the #81 Dragonspeed Oreca 07. In GTLM, Augusto Farfus set the fastest lap, with a 1:43.315, just 0.002 seconds ahead of the 2nd placed #911 Porsche 911 RSR. In GTD, Bill Auberlen posted a 1:45.165 to put his #96 Turner Motorsport BMW M6 GT3 in the lead, with Daniel Serra coming in 2nd in the #51 Spirit of Race Ferrari 488 GT3, 0.109 seconds behind.

Qualifying 

On Thursday's Qualifying session, which was divided into 3, with one session for the Prototypes, GTLM and GTD classes, which lasted for 15 minutes each, and a ten minute interval between the sessions. The rules dictated that all teams nominated a driver to qualify their cars, with the Pro-Am (LMP2/GTD) classes requiring a Bronze/Silver Rated Driver to qualify the car. The competitors' fastest lap times determined the starting order. IMSA then arranged the grid such that the Prototype and GTLM cars began ahead of the GTD field.

In the Prototype Qualifying session, Oliver Jarvis, driving for Mazda Team Joest, broke the Daytona International Speedway Road Course lap record to clinch pole position for the race, bringing the #77 Mazda RT-24P to the top of the timing screens early in the 15-minute prototype qualifying session before shaving his best effort down to a 1:33.685. This was two tenths quicker than the previous record around the road course of the Daytona International Speedway, that had remained unbeaten for over 25 years, and had been set by P. J. Jones in 1993 behind the wheel of a GTP Toyota Eagle MkIII. This pole position was the first ever for Mazda Team Joest, and the Mazda RT24-P. He was joined on the front row of the grid by Ricky Taylor in the #7 Acura Team Penske ARX-05, who interrupted a Joest 1–2 held by Jarvis and Jonathan Bomarito, until his Penske team-mate Juan Pablo Montoya jumped up to third shortly before the checkered flag. Bomarito’s time of 1:34.212 however, held out as the fourth-best, while Felipe Nasr brought the highest-placed Cadillac DPi-V.R to fifth on the grid. He was followed by another 4 more Cadillacs, with Jordan Taylor going sixth in the #10 Wayne Taylor Racing car, ahead of Juncos Racing’s Agustin Canapino, and the JDC-Miller Motorsports cars driven by Tristan Vautier and Stephen Simpson, while Jon Bennett propped up the running DPi field in the CORE Autosport run Ligier Nissan DPi. The defending race winning #5 Mustang Sampling Cadillac DPi-V.R failed to post a time during the session, after Filipe Albuquerque radioed his crew about engine problems.

In LMP2, James Allen took pole in the #81 DragonSpeed Oreca 07 Gibson, recording a time which was half a second quicker than the 2nd placed #52 PR1/Mathiasen Motorsports Oreca 07 driven by Gabriel Aubry.

Davide Rigon came in fourth fastest in the No. 62 Risi Competizione Ferrari 488 GTE, and was followed by Earl Bamber in the sister car to the #911, the #912. It was a tight qualifying session for the class, with all nine cars being covered by 0.982 seconds, and with the top four qualifiers in the class posting times under the previous class track record.

In GTD, Marcos Gomes set a track record for the class, while en route to taking the class pole position in the #13 Via Italia Racing Ferrari 488 GT3. The Brazilian broke Daniel Serra’s previous class qualifying record which had been set the previous year, while marking the third straight year that a Ferrari has taken the GTD class pole. Gomes’ best lap of 1:45.257 was 0.067 seconds faster than that of the second placed #33 Mercedes-AMG Team Riley Motorsports Mercedes-AMG GT3, driven by Ben Keating. Trent Hindman came third in the #86 Acura NSX GT3 Evo for Meyer Shank Racing. Lamborghini then took the next two spots on the grid with Giacomo Altoe and Rolf Ineichen for Ebimotors and GRT Grasser Racing Team, respectively. The top 13 cars in the GTD class were covered by less than one second, making for a closely packed qualifying session.

Qualifying results 
Pole positions in each class are indicated in bold.

Notes 
The #96 Turner Motorsports car had all its qualifying times  forfeited as per Article 40.2.9. of the Sporting regulations (car was touched by the crew during qualifying without permission by the officials).

Race report
After the green flag dropped on Saturday, Acura Team Penske held the advantage thanks to a strong performance from Juan Pablo Montoya, who passed Oliver Jarvis in the #77 Mazda RT24-P 30 minutes into the race. Though running strong, the Acura and Mazda cars faced pressure from the Action Express Racing Cadillacs in 5th and 6th two hours in. Kyle Masson and the #38 Performance Tech Motorsports team led the LMP2 class in their Oreca. In GTLM, Porsche and Ford's early challenge suffered teething troubles, after a splitter issue had put the #912 Porsche 911 RSR a lap behind class leader, and a three lap loss due to mechanical failure for the #67 Ford GT. Regardless, the sister car of the former manufacturer, #911, held the lead in the opening hour. In the GTD class, the #86 Meyer Shank Racing Acura NSX assumed a lead over the #33 Riley Motorsports Mercedes in 2nd, and the GRT Grasser Racing Lamborghini Huracan in 3rd.

After a Full-Course Yellow, which was triggered from an engine explosion from the #99 NGT Motorsport Porsche 911 GT3, the standings in DPi shuffled, with Dane Cameron holding a small lead over Felipe Nasr in the #31 Whelen Engineering Cadillac. Behind them were both Mazdas, continuing to put pressure on the leaders. A similar shuffle occurred in GTLM, with the #66 Ford GT of Chip Ganassi Racing emerging the leader ahead of the #4 Corvette Racing C7.R in second and #911 Porsche RSR in third. In the GTD class, Rik Breukers of the #11 GRT Grasser Racing Team emerged the leader, but was handed a four-minute pitlane penalty for ignoring full course caution procedures. James Allen led a 1-2 for the DragonSpeed team in the LMP2 class.

The defending overall winning team, the #5 Mustang Sampling Racing Cadillac had suffered a major blow to their challenge when, in the 3rd hour, an electrical issue had seen them initially out of the race. After 25 minutes in the garage, the #5 car returned to the track. The #6 Acura ARX-05 in the hands of Dane Cameron continued to lead in the DPi class, with the sister car in 3rd in the hands of Hélio Castroneves. Mazda driver René Rast set in between them in second, posing a challenge to Cameron's lead.

As evening fell, two-time Formula One World Driver's Champion Fernando Alonso began his first stint in the #10 Wayne Taylor Racing Cadillac. He muscled his way into the overall lead of the Rolex 24, after inheriting the car from Jordan Taylor in 7th position. Alonso took the lead from Rene Rast in the #77 Mazda. After a third Full-Course Yellow flag, Alonso maintained his overall lead, and handed the car over to Toyota Gazoo Racing team-mate Kamui Kobayashi with a 15-second advantage over the #77.

The #52 PR1/Mathiasen Motorsports Oreca 07 collided with the #85 Cadillac DPi-V.R. of JDC-Miller Motorsports, thus triggering a fourth Full-Course Yellow just before the 6-hour-mark of the race. Action Express Racing debutante Pipo Derani elected not to go to the pits when all other cars in the DPi class had, thus putting the #31 Cadillac in the lead. Prior to this, Kamui Kobayashi in the #10 Cadillac set the fastest lap of the race up to that point. In the GTLM class, Porsche GT Team driver Nick Tandy lost two places from pit stops after holding the lead, thus promoting the #4 Corvette C7.R to the lead, and the #62 Ferrari 488 GTE of Risi Competizione to an impressive second. The #33 Mercedes-AMG GT3 of Riley Motorsports held the lead in the GTD class, while DragonSpeed continued to be first and second in LMP2.

Results

Notes 
 The #67 Ford Chip Ganassi Racing car was assessed a 1 min 48 sec time penalty post race, for violating emergency fuel obligations.

  The #29 Montaplast by Land-Motorsport Audi R8 LMS was moved to the back of the class per Article 12.12C for a drive time infringement.

  The #63 Scuderia Corsa Ferrari 488 GT3 was moved to the back of the class per Article 12.12C for a drive time infringement.

References 

24 Hours of Daytona
2019 WeatherTech SportsCar Championship season
Daytona